In enzymology, a L-rhamnose 1-dehydrogenase is an enzyme that catalyzes the chemical reaction

L-rhamnofuranose + NAD+  L-rhamno-1,4-lactone + NADH + H+

Thus, the two substrates of this enzyme are L-rhamnofuranose and NAD+, whereas its 3 products are L-rhamno-1,4-lactone, NADH, and H+.

This enzyme belongs to the family of oxidoreductases, specifically those acting on the CH-OH group of donor with NAD+ or NADP+ as acceptor. The systematic name of this enzyme class is L-rhamnofuranose:NAD+ 1-oxidoreductase. This enzyme participates in fructose and mannose metabolism.

References

 
 

EC 1.1.1
NADH-dependent enzymes
Enzymes of unknown structure